Harry A. Pollard (23 January 1879 – 6 July 1934) was an American silent film actor and director. His wife was silent screen star Margarita Fischer.

Biography
Harry A. Pollard was born in Republic, Kansas, and began his career on the stage. In 1912 he joined the Selig Polyscope Company and starred in many of its motion pictures. He began directing films in 1913, and eventually stopped performing. His wife was actress Margarita Fischer, who starred in many of his films.

Pollard died in Pasadena, California, on 6 July 1934, aged 55, after a brief illness.

Select filmography

Actor
 On the Shore (1912)
 The Worth of a Man (1912)
 Jim's Atonement (1912)
 Nothing Shall Be Hidden (1912)
 Hearts in Conflict (1912)
 Uncle Tom's Cabin (1913)
 The Peacock Feather Fan (1914)
 Susie's New Shoes (1914)
 The Quest (1914)
 Infatuation (1915)
 The Pearl of Paradise (1916)

Director
 The Peacock Feather Fan (1914)
 Motherhood (1914)
 The Quest (1914)
 Break, Break, Break (1914)
 The Girl from His Town (1915)
 Infatuation (1915)
 The Miracle of Life (1915)
 The Dragon (1916)
 The Pearl of Paradise (1916)
 The Devil's Assistant (1917)
 The Girl Who Couldn't Grow Up (1917)
 The Danger Game (1918)
 Which Woman? (1918)
 The Invisible Ray (1920)
 Trimmed (1922)
 The Loaded Door (1922)
 Confidence (1922)
 Trifling with Honor (1923)
 Sporting Youth (1924)
 The Reckless Age (1924)
 K – The Unknown (1924)
 Oh Doctor! (1925)
 I'll Show You the Town (1925)
 California Straight Ahead (1925)
 The Cohens and Kellys (1926)
 Poker Faces (1926)
 Uncle Tom's Cabin (1927)
 Show Boat (1929)
 Tonight at Twelve (1929)
 Undertow (1930)
 Shipmates (1931)
 The Prodigal (1931)
 When a Feller Needs a Friend (1932)
 Fast Life (1932)

References

External links

 Harry Pollard Papers at Wichita State University
 
 

1879 births
1934 deaths
People from Republic County, Kansas
Male actors from Kansas
American male film actors
Silent film directors
American male silent film actors
20th-century American male actors
Deaths from cancer in California
Film directors from Kansas